AWR may refer to:

 Adventist World Radio
 Automatic Workload Repository in Oracle Databases
 Applied Wave Research